Ashur, Ashshur, also spelled Ašur, Aššur (Sumerian:  AN.ŠAR₂, Assyrian cuneiform:  , also phonetically  ) is a god of the ancient Assyrians and Akkadians, and the head of the Assyrian pantheon in Mesopotamian religion, who was worshipped mainly in northern Mesopotamia, and parts of north-east Syria and south-east Asia Minor which constituted old Assyria. He may have had a solar iconography.

Legend
Aššur was a deified form of the city of Assur, which dates from the mid 3rd millennium BC and was the capital of the Old Assyrian kingdom. As such, Ashur did not originally have a family, but as the cult came under southern Mesopotamian influence, he later came to be regarded as the Assyrian equivalent of Enlil, the chief god of Nippur. Enlil was the most important god of the southern pantheon from the early 3rd millennium BC until Hammurabi founded an empire based in Babylon in the mid-18th century BC, after which Marduk replaced Enlil as the chief god in the south. In the north, Ashur absorbed Enlil's wife Ninlil (as the Assyrian goddess Mullissu) and his sons Ninurta and Zababa—this process began around the 14th century BC and continued down to the 7th century.

During the various periods of Assyrian conquest, such as the Old Assyrian Empire of Shamshi-Adad I (1813–1750 BC), Middle Assyrian Empire (1391–1056 BC) and Neo-Assyrian Empire (911–605 BC), Assyrian imperial propaganda proclaimed the supremacy of Ashur and declared that the conquered peoples had been abandoned by their own gods.

When Assyria conquered Babylon in the Sargonid period (8th–7th centuries BC), Assyrian scribes began to write the name of Ashur with the cuneiform signs  AN.ŠAR2, the ideograms for "whole heaven" in Sumerian, simplified into  AN.ŠAR2 in Assyrian cuneiform,  which came to be pronounced Aššur in the Assyrian dialect of Akkadian, the language of Assyria and Babylonia. The intention seems to have been to put Aššur at the head of the Babylonian pantheon, where Anshar and his counterpart Kishar ("whole earth") preceded even Enlil and Ninlil. Thus in the Sargonid version of the Enuma Elish, the Babylonian national creation myth, Marduk, the chief god of Babylon, does not appear, and instead it is Ashur, as Anshar, who slays Tiamat the chaos-monster and creates the world of humankind.

Representation and symbolism

Ashur was represented as the winged sun disc that appears frequently in Assyrian iconography. Many Assyrian kings had names that included the name Ashur, including, above all, Ashur-uballit I, Ashurnasirpal, Esarhaddon (Ashur-aha-iddina), and Ashurbanipal. Epithets include bêlu rabû "great lord", ab ilâni "father of gods",  šadû rabû "great mountain", and il aššurî "god of Ashur". The symbols of Ashur include:

 a winged disc with horns, enclosing four circles revolving round a middle circle; rippling rays fall down from either side of the disc;
 a circle or wheel, suspended from wings, and enclosing a warrior drawing his bow to discharge an arrow;
 the same circle; the warrior's bow, however, is carried in his left hand, while the right hand is uplifted as if to bless his worshipers (see picture).

An Assyrian standard, which probably represented the world column, has the disc mounted on a bull's head with horns. The upper part of the disc is occupied by a warrior, whose head, part of his bow, and the point of his arrow protrude from the circle. The rippling water rays are V-shaped, and two bulls, treading river-like rays, occupy the divisions thus formed. There are also two heads—a lion's and a man's—with gaping mouths, which may symbolize tempests, the destroying power of the sun, or the sources of the Tigris and Euphrates. Jastrow regards the winged disc as "the purer and more genuine symbol of Ashur as a solar deity". He calls it "a sun disc with protruding rays", and says: "To this symbol the warrior with the bow and arrow was added—a despiritualization that reflects the martial spirit of the Assyrian empire".

The Assyrian Tree of Life 
Simo Parpola explored the use of the 'Tree of life' motif when Ashur is depicted in reliefs. Often, Ashur is depicted in a winged disk hovering on top of a tree, for instance, in Ashurnasirpal's throne room in Calah which was inscribed with "vice-regent of Ashur".

Parpola continues by drawing on parallels between the Ein Sof in the Kabbalah and the symbolism of Ashur with the Tree of life. The depiction of Ashur, the universal God, behind a solar disk, representing light as his essential nature, just as in Kabbalah, is just one instance of Parpola's comparison.

See also
 Anshar
 Ahura Mazda
 Asura
 Farr-e Kiyani (Faravahar)
 Ashur (Bible)
 Yahweh

References

Early Period (Assyria)
Mesopotamian gods
Solar gods
Jovian deities